James Boon Lankershim (1850–1931) was an American heir, landowner and real estate developer.

Early life
James Boon Lankershim was born on March 24, 1850, in Charleston, Missouri. His father was Isaac Lankershim (1818–1882), a German-born Californian landowner who owned 60,000 acres in the San Fernando Valley, and his mother was Annis Lydia Moore (1818–1901), an English-born Californian.

Career

Lankershim joined his father's company, the San Fernando Farm Homestead Association, together with his brother in law, Isaac Newton Van Nuys (1836–1912), focusing on real estate while Van Nuys focused on wheat. He built the Hotel Lankershim (completed 1905) on the corner of Broadway and 7th Avenue in Downtown Los Angeles, now demolished and used as space for a parking lot. He also built the San Fernando Building on the corner of 4th Avenue and Main Street, where his name is embedded in the tiles at the entrance.

In 1885, Lankershim established a cavalry unit in the California National Guard, Troop D, and became lieutenant colonel.

Lankershim served as the first president of the Los Angeles Athletic Club, a private member's club in Los Angeles.

Personal life, death and legacy
Lankershim married Carolina "Carrie" Adelaide Jones in 1881. By 1900, they separated and she moved to Paris, only to return briefly during the First World War. They had two children, Jack Lankershim and Doria Lankershim. In the 1920s, he retired and moved to the Biltmore Hotel in downtown Los Angeles. On April 2, 1921, he donated  20 acres of the San Fernando Valley to the Boys Scouts of America, later known as the Arthur Letts Boy Scout Camp after Arthur Letts (1862–1923). In 1940, they built an obelisk in his honor on the donated land.

In 1924, silent actress Adele Blood (1886–1936) introduced him to Irene Herbert, a nurse who became his companion for four years until his family fired her. He died on October 16, 1931, and his ashes were scattered across the San Fernando Valley. After his death, Irene Herbert claimed she had a $500,000-promisory note from her former employer and sued the Lankershim family, but later gave up and committed suicide.

Lankershim Boulevard in Los Angeles is named for the Lankershim family.

References

1850 births
1931 deaths
People from Charleston, Missouri
People from Los Angeles County, California
Businesspeople from Los Angeles
Land owners from California
People in 19th-century California
American people of English descent
American people of German descent
American people of German-Jewish descent
19th century in Los Angeles
20th century in Los Angeles